This is a list of notable Urdu language writers with their date of birth who wrote Novels in Urdu.

19th Century

20th century 
 Shaukat Thanvi 1904
 Mumtaz Mufti 1905 
 Krishan Chander 1914
 Naseem Hijazi 1914
 Mirza Adeeb 1914
 Khwaja Ahmad Abbas 1914
 Naseem Hijazi 1914
 Ismat Chughtai 1915
 Rajinder Singh Bedi 1915
 Ahmad Nadeem Qasmi 1916
 Jagan Nath Azad 1918
 Razia Butt 1924
 Shaukat Siddiqui 1923
 Intizar Hussain 1923
 Ashfaq Ahmed 1925
 Harcharan Chawla 
 Ibn-e-Insha 1927
 Qurratulain Hyder 1927
 Begum Akhtar Riazuddin 1928
 Ibn-e-Safi 1928
 Bano Qudsia 1928
 Shabnam Romani 1928
 Altaf Fatima 1929
 Fatima Surayya Bajia 1930
 Obaidullah Baig 1936
 Muhammad Mansha Yaad 1937
 Mustansar Hussain Tarar 1939
 Anis Nagi 1939
 Mazhar ul Islam 1949
 Mirza Athar Baig 1950 
 Zulfiqar Gilani 1960
 Pervez Bilgrami 1962
 Muhammad Asim Butt 1966
 Azhar Abidi 1968
 Rahman Abbas 1972
 Akhtar Raza Saleemi 1974
 Ali Akbar Natiq 1974
 Idris Azad 1969
 Farhat Ishtiaq 1980
 Sarwat Nazir

21st century 
 Rahman Abbas
 Jogindar Paal
 Nand Kishore Vikram
 Hashim Nadeem

References

Urdu-language fiction writers
Urdu-language novelists
Urdu-language writers